Vers-Pont-du-Gard (Vèrs in Occitan) is a commune in the Gard department in southern France.

The Pont du Gard is located on the territory of the commune.

Gallery

Population

International relations
Vers-Pont-du-Gard is twinned with:
 Santa Vittoria d'Alba, Italy
 Palézieux, Switzerland

See also
Communes of the Gard department

References

External links

 Website of Vers-Pont-du-Gard
 Webpage about Vers-Pont-du-Gard

Communes of Gard